Kenneth McCormick is a fictional character and one of four protagonists in the adult animated sitcom South Park, alongside Stan Marsh, Kyle Broflovski, and Eric Cartman. His often muffled and incomprehensible speech—the result of his parka hood covering his mouth—is provided by co-creator Matt Stone. After early appearances in The Spirit of Christmas shorts in 1992 and 1995, Kenny appeared in South Park television episodes beginning August 13, 1997, as well as the 1999 feature film South Park: Bigger, Longer & Uncut, where his uncovered face and voice were first revealed.

Kenny is a third, later fourth-grade student who commonly has extraordinary experiences not typical of conventional small-town life in his hometown of South Park, Colorado, where he lives with his poverty-stricken family. Kenny is animated by computer to look as he did in the show's original method of cutout animation. 

The character gained popularity thanks to a running gag during the first five seasons of the series, whereby Kenny would routinely suffer an excruciating death before returning alive and well in the next episode with little explanation. Stan would frequently use the catchphrase "Oh, my God! They killed Kenny!", followed by Kyle exclaiming "You bastard(s)!". Since the sixth season in 2002, the practice of killing Kenny has been seldom used by the show's creators. Various episodes have set up the gag, sometimes presenting alternate explanations for Kenny's unacknowledged reappearances.

Role in South Park
Kenny attends South Park Elementary as part of Mr. Garrison's fourth-grade class. During the first 58 episodes, Kenny and the other main child characters were in the third grade. Kenny comes from a poor household, presided over by his alcoholic, unemployed father, Stuart McCormick. His mother Carol McCormick has a job washing dishes at the Olive Garden. Kenny has an older brother named Kevin. He also has a younger sister who is shown with his family in the season nine episode "Best Friends Forever", but does not reappear until the 15th season episode "The Poor Kid", where her name is revealed to be Karen, whom he loves unconditionally. Kenny is friends with Stan, Kyle, Cartman, and Butters. Kenny is regularly teased for living in poverty, particularly by Cartman.

Kenny's superhero alter ego, Mysterion, first appeared in the Season 13 episode "The Coon", as a rival to Eric Cartman's eponymous superhero alter ego. He unmasks himself at the end of the episode, but his identity is left intentionally ambiguous to the viewer. He is not revealed to be Kenny until the Season 14 episode "Mysterion Rises", the character's third appearance as part of a story arc.

Deaths
Prior to season six, Kenny died in almost every episode. The nature of the deaths was often gruesome and portrayed in a comically absurd fashion, and usually followed by Stan (or Kyle) respectively yelling "Oh, my God! They killed Kenny!" with Kyle yelling "You bastard(s)!" Shortly afterward, rats would commonly appear and begin picking at his corpse. In a following episode, Kenny would reappear alive and well, usually without any explanation. Most characters appear oblivious or indifferent to the phenomenon, although occasionally one will acknowledge awareness of it. In "Cherokee Hair Tampons", Kenny gets irritated and offended when Stan laments Kyle's critical condition while utterly ignoring Kenny's past demises. Eric Cartman commented on Kenny's deaths in the episode "Cartmanland" when he is being sued for unsafe rides insisting to attorneys representing his family that "Kenny? He dies all the time!" In "Mr. Hankey, the Christmas Poo", as the episode is about to end, the kids point out that "something feels unfinished", and Kenny celebrates as "The End" sign appears; it is the first episode in the series he survives.

Near the end of the production run of the show's fifth season, Parker and Stone contemplated having an episode in which Kenny was killed off permanently. The reasoning behind the idea was to genuinely surprise fans, and to allow an opportunity to provide a major role for Butters Stotch, a breakout character whose popularity was growing with the viewers and creators of the show. In the episode "Kenny Dies", Kenny dies after developing terminal muscular dystrophy, while Parker and Stone claimed that Kenny would not be returning in subsequent episodes. The duo insisted they grew tired of upholding the tradition of having Kenny die in each episode. Stone stated that thinking of humorous ways to kill the character was initially fun, but became more mundane as the series progressed. When they determined that it would be too difficult to develop the character because he was too much of a "prop", Parker and Stone finally decided to kill off Kenny permanently.

For much of season six, Kenny remained dead, though he still appears to possess Cartman's body, and both Stone and Parker entertained the idea of eventually bringing the character back. According to Stone, only a small minority of fans were significantly angered by Kenny's absence to threaten a boycott of the cable channel Comedy Central, on which South Park is aired. For most of the season, Stan, Kyle, and Cartman fill the void left by Kenny by allowing the characters Butters Stotch and Tweek Tweak into their group, paving the way for those characters to receive more focus on the show; nevertheless, Kenny returned from the year-long absence in the season six finale "Red Sleigh Down", has remained the main character since, and has been given larger roles in episodes.

The first explanation given for Kenny's deaths and reappearances was given in "Cartman Joins NAMBLA", wherein the McCormicks have a baby exactly like Kenny, including the characteristic orange parka, shortly after the former Kenny dies. Mr. McCormick exclaims, "God, this must be the fiftieth time this has happened", to which Mrs. McCormick quickly replies, "Fifty-second". This explanation is expanded upon in the Season 14 episodes "Coon 2: Hindsight", "Mysterion Rises" and "Coon vs. Coon and Friends", in which Kenny, while playing superheroes with his friends, claims his "superpower" is immortality. He actually dies several times during these episodes—even committing suicide more than once—reawakening alive and unharmed in his bed each time. He is frustrated and angry that no one can remember him dying every time he regenerates and longs to know the source of his power, which he views as a curse. Unbeknownst to him, his parents were previously connected to a Cthulhu-worshipping death cult. After Kenny shoots himself the second time, Mrs. McCormick awakes with a scream, shrieks "It's happening again!", and minutes later, is shown gently placing a newborn Kenny in his bed. "We should never have gone to that stupid cult meeting," she grouses as she and her husband return to bed.

In "Put It Down", he is killed off-screen by a driver on his phone, as his picture is shown among those of kids killed by a driver on phone texting tribute. In "Bike Parade", Jeff Bezos tells Alexa to kill Kenny, and Cartman hauls his coffin while riding his bike in the parade. "The Pandemic Special" sees Kenny being gunned down by the police when they are equipped with military weaponry to deal with the children breaking free from COVID-19 quarantine.

In South Park: Post Covid, as a millionaire scientist in the future finding the cause of COVID-19, McCormick dies due to a time travel experiment that got him a variant named COVID Delta+ Rewards. This death is undone in South Park: Post Covid: The Return of Covid after Stan, Kyle, and Cartman time travel to the past.

Character

Creation and design

When developing the character, the show's creators had observed that most groups of childhood friends in small middle-class towns always included "the one poor kid" and decided to portray Kenny in this light.

In a 2000 interview, Parker said that Kenny was based on a childhood friend of his who was also named Kenny and wore an orange parka that muffled his voice. He too was the poorest kid in the neighborhood and often skipped school, causing Parker and his friends to jokingly say he died, only for him to return to school later.

An unnamed precursor to Kenny first appeared in the first The Spirit of Christmas short, dubbed Jesus vs. Frosty, created by Parker and Stone in 1992 while they were students at the University of Colorado. The character was composed of construction paper cutouts and animated through the use of stop motion. When tasked three years later by friend Brian Graden to create another short as a video Christmas card that he could send to friends, Parker and Stone created another similarly-animated The Spirit of Christmas short, dubbed Jesus vs. Santa. In this short, Kenny is given his first name, and first appears as he does in the series.
Kenny next appeared on August 13, 1997, when South Park debuted on Comedy Central with the episode "Cartman Gets an Anal Probe".

In tradition with the show's animation style, Kenny is composed of simple geometrical shapes and primary colors. He is not offered the same free range of motion associated with hand-drawn characters; his character is mostly shown from only one angle, and his movements are animated in an intentionally jerky fashion. Ever since the show's second episode, "Weight Gain 4000" (season one, 1997), Kenny, like all other characters on the show, has been animated with computer software, though he is portrayed to give the impression that the show still utilizes its original technique.

The effect of Kenny's speech is achieved by Stone mumbling into his own hand as he provides Kenny's lines. While he originally voiced Kenny without any computer manipulation, Stone now does so by speaking in his normal vocal range and then adding a childlike inflection. The recorded audio is then edited with Pro Tools, and the pitch is altered to make the voice sound more like that of a fourth-grader. As the technique of Kenny's muzzled enunciation frequently implies, many of his lines are indeed profane and sexually explicit, the lengthier of which are mostly improvised by Stone.

He first appeared unobscured by his hood in South Park: Bigger, Longer & Uncut, where it was revealed that he had messy blonde hair. Mike Judge provided the voice for Kenny's one line of uninsulated dialogue: "Goodbye, you guys." On a few occasions during episodes that have originally aired since the film's release, he has been seen without the parka; however, unlike in Bigger, Longer & Uncut his entire face has been only seen three times in the television series without being partially obscured or otherwise altered, this being in "The Losing Edge", "The Jeffersons", and "You're Getting Old". He also speaks unmuffled during some of these instances, in which case co-producer Eric Stough provides Kenny's voice. During "The Coon" episodes of seasons 13 and 14, Kenny has his first major speaking role as the character Mysterion.

Personality and traits
While most child characters on the show are foul-mouthed, Kenny is often even more risqué with his dialogue. Parker and Stone state that they depict Kenny and his friends in this manner in order to display how young boys really talk when they are alone. While Kenny is often cynical and profane, Parker notes that there nonetheless is an "underlying sweetness" aspect to the character, and Time magazine described Kenny and his friends as "sometimes cruel but with a core of innocence". He is amused by toilet humor and bodily functions, and his favorite television personalities are Terrance and Phillip, a Canadian duo whose comedy routines on their show-within-the-show revolve substantially around fart jokes. Kenny is shown to desire intercourse in the episode "The Ring", when Kenny gets a girlfriend and is overjoyed to find out that she has a reputation as a slut. Kenny is also lecherous, and often portrayed as being eager to do and say disgusting things in an attempt to impress others or earn money. Conversely, his alter-ego Mysterion is seemingly mature, principled, and serious-minded, the only exception being one instance in "Mysterion Rises" in which he takes delight in irritating Cartman. As Mysterion, he convinces his parents to take better care of themselves and their children, as seen by their reaction when he questions them about the cult of Cthulhu. He also uses his disguise to protect his sister Karen (who refers to Mysterion as her "guardian angel"), as revealed in "The Poor Kid"; however, in all of his guises, Kenny is depicted as being uncommonly selfless, dying for the sake of others and spending all of his time working so he could buy his little sister a doll.

In the trilogy of episodes "Black Friday", "A Song of Ass and Fire" and "Titties and Dragons", in which the boys play-act characters from the TV series Game of Thrones, Kenny cross-dresses as a fantasy-style princess with a wig and dress similar to the video game character Princess Zelda, and becomes a Japanese-speaking moe anime character at one point. When Cartman complains, "You're never going to be a real princess", Princess Kenny responds (via her translator, Stan) angrily to Cartman, calling him a "ball-licking lesbian".

This portrayal continues in the video game South Park: The Stick of Truth where Cartman notes that playing a "chick" is "just how [Kenny] seems to be rolling right now". Kenny's sister also refers to Kenny as a girl, if you talk to her in the McCormick house. Throughout the game, Kenny posts 'status updates' referring to herself as "the cutest of them all".

In other media
Kenny had a major role in South Park: Bigger, Longer & Uncut, the full-length film based on the series, and appeared on the film's soundtrack singing (albeit muffled) several lines of the song "Mountain Town" from the film. As a tribute to the Dead Parrot sketch, a short that features Kenny as a "dead friend" being returned by Cartman to a shop run by Kyle aired during a 1999 BBC television special commemorating the 30th anniversary of Monty Python's Flying Circus. Kenny was also featured in the documentary film The Aristocrats, listening to Cartman tell his version of the film's titular joke, and in "The Gauntlet", a short spoofing both Gladiator and Battlefield Earth that aired during the 2000 MTV Movie Awards.

Kenny also appears in six South Park-related video games: In South Park, Kenny is controlled by the player through the first-person shooter mode who attempts to ward off enemies from terrorizing the town of South Park. In South Park: Chef's Luv Shack, a user has the option of playing as Kenny when participating in the game's several "minigames" based on other popular arcade games. In the racing game South Park Rally, a user can race as Kenny against other users playing as other characters, while choosing to place him in any of a variety of vehicles. In South Park Let's Go Tower Defense Play!, Kenny can be selected as a playable character used to establish a tower defense against the game's antagonists. In South Park: The Stick of Truth, Kenny (as Princess Kenny) can be selected as a companion over the course of much of the game. In South Park: The Fractured But Whole, Kenny is seen as his alter-ego Mysterion.

Cultural impact

Kenny's deaths are well known in popular culture, and was one of the things viewers most commonly associated with South Park during its earlier seasons. IGN ranked Kenny at #6 on their "The Top 25 South Park Characters" list. The exclamation of "Oh my God! They killed Kenny!" quickly became a popular catchphrase, while both Kenny and the phrase have appeared on some of the more popular pieces of South Park merchandise, including shirts, bumper stickers, calendars and baseball caps, and inspired the rap song "Kenny's Dead" by Master P, which was featured on Chef Aid: The South Park Album.

The running gag of Kenny's deaths in earlier seasons was incorporated into the season 9 (2005) episode "Best Friends Forever" when Kenny, in a vegetative state, is kept alive by a feeding tube while a media circus erupted over whether the tube should be removed and allow Kenny to die. The episode received much attention as it served to provide commentary on the Terri Schiavo case, originally airing just one day before Schiavo died. The episode earned South Park its first Emmy Award for Outstanding Animated Program.

Kenny's deaths have been subject to much critical analysis in the media and literary world. In the book South Park and Philosophy: Bigger, Longer, and More Penetrating, an essay by Southern Illinois University philosophy professor Randall Auxier, entitled "Killing Kenny: Our Daily Dose of Death", suggests that the fashion of the recurring gag serves to help the viewer become more comfortable with the inevitability of their own death. In the book South Park and Philosophy: You Know, I Learned Something Today, University of Wisconsin–Stevens Point professor Karin Fry wrote an essay concerning the parallels between Kenny's role in the show and the different concepts of existentialism.

When Sophie Rutschmann of the University of Strasbourg discovered a mutated gene that causes an adult fruit fly to die within two days after it is infected with certain bacteria, she named the gene "Kenny" in honor of the character.

Notes

References

External links

 Kenny McCormick on SouthParkStudios.com

Child characters in television
Child characters in animated films
Television characters introduced in 1992
Fictional characters from Colorado
South Park characters
Fictional characters with death or rebirth abilities
Fictional characters with immortality
Fictional child deaths
Fictional elementary school students
Fictional ghosts
Fictional murdered people
Fictional scientists
Fictional suicides
Fictional vigilantes
Fictional zombies and revenants
Video game bosses
Comedy film characters
Male characters in animated series
Male characters in film
Child superheroes
Television superheroes
Animated characters introduced in 1992